Ellis Elmer Horton (September 4, 1866 – August 12, 1920), nicknamed "Herky Jerky", was a pitcher in Major League Baseball who played in two games with the Pittsburgh Pirates in 1896 and in one game for the Brooklyn Bridegrooms in 1898.

References

External links

1866 births
1918 deaths
Major League Baseball pitchers
Baseball players from Ohio
Pittsburgh Pirates players
Brooklyn Bridegrooms players
19th-century baseball players
Sportspeople from Hamilton, Ohio
Minor league baseball managers
Rockford Forest City players
Rockford Reds players
Terre Haute Hottentots players
Albany Senators players
Toronto Canadians players
Reading Actives players
Syracuse Stars (minor league baseball) players
Buffalo Bisons (minor league) players
Rochester Patriots players
Ottawa Wanderers players
Worcester Farmers players
Utica Pentups players
Rochester Bronchos players
Utica Pent-Ups players
Amsterdam-Gloversville-Johnstown Hyphens players
Ilion Typewriters players